Joseph Bergler the Elder (1718–1788) was an Austrian sculptor.

Bergler was born in Salzburg, the father of painter Joseph Bergler the Younger (1753–1829). The eleven Calvary chapels on the Capuchin mountain contain figures created in 1740 by Bergler as well as Lorenz Hörmbler. Bergler commenced with the initial training of his son in Passau in Lower Bavaria.

References 

1718 births
1788 deaths
Austrian male sculptors
Artists from Salzburg
18th-century Austrian sculptors
18th-century Austrian male artists